Bangert is an unincorporated community in Dent County, in the U.S. state of Missouri.

History
An early variant name was Avery. A post office called Avery was in operation from 1880 until 1886, the name was changed to Bangert in 1902, and the post office closed in 1951. Avery was the name of C. A. Avery, an early postmaster, and Bangert was the name of a railroad official.

References

Unincorporated communities in Dent County, Missouri
Unincorporated communities in Missouri